Karl-Eduard Pajos (also Karl-Eduard Pajus; 2 July 1894 Rakvere Parish, Kreis Wierland – 23 May 1953 Ussolye prison camp, Perm Oblast) was an Estonian politician. He was a member of IV Riigikogu. On 20 May 1930, he resigned his position and he was replaced by August Julius Leps.

References

1894 births
1953 deaths
People from Rakvere Parish
People from Kreis Wierland
Farmers' Assemblies politicians
Patriotic League (Estonia) politicians
Members of the Riigikogu, 1929–1932
Members of the Estonian National Assembly
Members of the Riigivolikogu
Estonian people who died in Soviet detention
People who died in the Gulag